Rosemary Wells (born January 29, 1943) is an American writer and illustrator of children's books. She is well known for using animal characters to address real human issues. Some of her most well-known characters are Max & Ruby (later adapted into a Canadian-animated preschool television series, which aired on Nickelodeon (part of Nick Jr. block) since 2002), Noisy Nora, and Yoko.

Background
Wells was born in New York City and raised in Red Bank, New Jersey. Her mother was a ballerina with the Ballet Ruse de Monte Carlo and her father was a playwright. She began drawing at age two. When Wells was nineteen, she attended the Boston Museum School where she studied illustration. Before becoming an author and illustrator, Wells worked as an art editor for Allyn and Bacon, Inc and as an art designer for Macmillan Publishing. In 1963, she married architect Thomas Moore Wells, with whom she has two daughters, and in 1968, she published her first book, an illustrated version of Gilbert and Sullivan’s A Song to Sing, O!. She has since published more than 60 books in her over 30 year career. 

A common theme in Rosemary Wells' stories is the use of animal characters rather than humans. In the children's journal Stone Soup, Wells explained that she writes using animals because it allows her to address sophisticated, controversial topics in ways children can understand and adults can accept.  For example, Yoko tackles the thorny topic of racism. It is about a young Japanese kitten who, in the beginning, is ostracized when she brings in sushi for her school lunch. At the story's conclusion, she gains acceptance by hosting a school luncheon where everyone brings in food native to their family from around the world.  Many of the animal characters, such as those in Max & Ruby, interact with one another much as humans would, while others such as McDuff – a West Highland Terrier – take on a more realistic role as the adopted pet of a young couple.

Works

Children's books
1971–1973
Library of Congress catalog records imply that these six are children's picture books.
 Impossible, Possum (1971), written by Ellen Conford
 A Hot Thirsty Day (1971), by Marjorie W. Sharmat
 Two Sisters and Some Hornets (1972), by Beryl Epstein and Dorrit Davis
 Unfortunately Harriet (1972)
 Noisy Nora (1973)
 Benjamin & Tulip (1973)

Later

Abdul
Bingo
Carry Me!
Doris's Dinosaur
Edward the Unready series
Edward Unready for School
Edward's Overwhelming Overnight
Edward in Deep Water
Emily's First 100 Days of School
Emily's Middle School
Felix Feels Better
Felix Stands Tall
Fiona's Little Lie
Fritz and the Mess Fairy
Getting to Know You: Rodgers and Hammerstein Favorites
Good Night Fred
Goodnight Lucas
Hazel's Amazing Mother
I Love You: A Bushel and a Peck
Kindergators series
Hands Off, Harry!
Miracle Melts Down
Lassie
Lassie Come-Home
Love Waves
Max & Ruby series
Baby Max & Ruby: Clean-Up Time
Baby Max & Ruby: Peek-a-Boo
Baby Max & Ruby: Red Boots
Baby Max & Ruby: Shopping
Bunny Cakes
Bunny Mail
Bunny Money
Bunny Party
Goodnight Max
Hooray for Max
Max & Ruby in Pandora's Box – Max & Ruby's First Greek Myth
Max & Ruby Play School
Max & Ruby's Bedtime Book
Max & Ruby's Busy Week
Max & Ruby's Midas: Another Greek Myth
Max & Ruby's Preschool Pranks
Max & Ruby's Show and Tell
Max & Ruby's Snowy Day
Max & Ruby's Storybook Collection
Max Cleans Up
Max Counts His Chickens
Max Drives Away
Max's ABC
Max's Bath
Max's Bedtime
Max's Birthday
Max's Breakfast
Max's Bunny Business
Max's Chocolate Chicken
Max's Christmas
Max's Christmas Stocking
Max's Dragon Shirt
Max's First Word
Max's New Suit
Max's Ride
Max's Snowsuit
Max's Toys
Max's Work of Art
Play with Max & Ruby
Read to Your Bunny
Ruby's Beauty Shop
Ruby's Cupcakes
Ruby's Falling Leaves
Ruby's Tea for Two
McDuff series
McDuff and Friends
McDuff and the Baby
McDuff Comes Home
McDuff Goes to School
McDuff Moves In
McDuff Saves the Day
McDuff Steps Out
McDuff Stories
McDuff's Favorite Things
McDuff's Hide-and-Seek
McDuff's New Friend; reissued as McDuff's Christmas
McDuff's Wild Romp
Morris's Disappearing Bag
Mother Goose series (illustrator only)
My Very First Mother Goose
Here Comes Mother Goose
Mother Goose's Little Treasures
My Kindergarten
My Shining Star
Night Sounds, Morning Colors
Old MacDonald
Otto Runs for President
Peabody
Shy Charles
Sophie series
Sophie’s Christmas Surprise
Sophie’s Halloween Disguise
Sophie's Terrible Twos
Ten Kisses for Sophie
Time Out for Sophie
Use Your Words Sophie
Stanley and Rhoda
Stella's Starliner
Tell Me a Trudy (illustrator only)
The Bear Went Over the Mountain
The Christmas Mystery (illustrator only)
The Gulps (writer only)
The Itsy Bitsy Spider
The Miraculous Tale of the Two Maries
Timothy Goes to School
Voyage to the Bunny Planet series
First Tomato
The Island Light
Moss Pillows
Yoko series
Yoko
Yoko Learns to Read
Yoko Writes Her Name
Yoko's Paper Cranes
Yoko's Show-and-Tell
Yoko's World of Kindness
Bubble Gum Radar
Yoko Finds Her Way

Other books
 Fog Comes on Little Pig Feet (1972)
Following Grandfather
Help Children Cope with Divorce
Help Children Cope with Grief
House in the Mail
Lincoln and His Boys
Mary on Horseback
My Havana: Memories of a Cuban Boyhood, written with Secundino Fernandez, illustrated by Peter Ferguson
On the Blue Comet, illus. Bagram Ibatoulline
Red Moon at Sharpsburg
Streets of Gold
Through the Hidden Door
Leave Well Enough Alone
The Man in the Woods
When No One Was Looking
Little Bunny, Big Germs

Awards and recognition 
Rosemary Wells's books have received starred reviews from Kirkus Reviews, Publishers Weekly, Booklist, and Horn Book Magazine. She has been nominated for numerous awards such as the Edgar Allan Poe Award, the Black-Eyed Susan Award, the Red Clover Award, and the Beehive Award. She has won the following:

 Irma S. and James H. Black Award, 1975 - Morris's Disappearing Bag
 Virginia Readers Choice Award, 1987 - Man in the Woods
 Boston Globe-Horn Book Award, 1989 - Shy Charles
 Parents Choice Award, 2014 - Stella's Starliner

References

External links

Rosemary Wells Papers at University of Connecticut Archives

1943 births
Living people
American children's writers
People from Red Bank, New Jersey
American children's book illustrators